The 2015 ASB Classic was a women's tennis tournament played on outdoor hard courts. It was the 30th edition of the ASB Classic, and part of the WTA International tournaments category of the 2015 WTA Tour. It took place at the ASB Tennis Centre in Auckland, New Zealand, from 5 to 10 January 2015.

Points and prize money

Point distribution

Prize money 

1 Qualifiers' prize money is also the Round of 32 prize money
* per team

Singles entrants

Seeds 

1 Rankings as of 5 January 2015.

Other entrants 
The following players received wildcards into the singles main draw: 
  Taylor Townsend

The following players received entry from the qualifying draw:
  Julia Glushko
  Lucie Hradecká
  Urszula Radwańska
  Anna Tatishvili

Doubles entrants

Seeds 

1 Rankings as of 29 December 2014

Other entrants 
The following pairs received wildcards into the doubles main draw:
  Rosie Cheng /  Katherine Westbury
  Marina Erakovic /  Monica Puig

Finals

Singles 

  Venus Williams defeated  Caroline Wozniacki, 2–6, 6–3, 6–3

Doubles 

  Sara Errani /  Roberta Vinci defeated  Shuko Aoyama /  Renata Voráčová, 6–2, 6–1

See also
 2015 Heineken Open – men's tournament

External links 
 

2015 WTA Tour
2015
ASB
January 2015 sports events in New Zealand
2015 in New Zealand tennis